Francesco Panzieri (born April 27, 1985) is an Italian-American visual effects compositing artist and supervisor. He has worked on the films of Denis Villeneuve, J. J. Abrams, Quentin Tarantino and Anthony & Joe Russo, among others.

Education
Panzieri was born in Pescara, Italy. He developed an interest in film-making and special effects from an early age. In 2008, Panzieri earned a Bachelor of Science degree in Film Science from the International Academy of Image Arts (Accademia Internazionale Per Le Arti & Le Scienze Dell'Immagine) in L'Aquila, Italy, which was founded in 1992 by Academy Award recipient for Best Achievement in Cinematography Vittorio Storaro and Gabriele Lucci. Focused on deepening his VFX knowledge in the United States of America, he then enrolled himself in the one-year 3D-animation & visual effects conservatory program at the New York Film Academy in New York City, NY.

Flash Film Works
In 2009, Panzieri was hired to work at the visual effects boutique Flash Film Works in Hollywood, California; under the guidance of the studio's owner, William Mesa, Panzieri started his career as Rotoscope / Paint artist on the live-action web series The Blood Factory, a gory episodic created by screenwriter John Albo and actor/director Danny DeVito. His second assignment was on the 2010 feature film Clash of the Titans, a remake of the original 1981 version.

Star Wars: The Force Awakens
In 2015, Panzieri was called to join the in-house visual effects team at J. J. Abrams' production company Bad Robot Productions, to work on the feature film Star Wars: The Force Awakens. The film broke various box office records and became, unadjusted for inflation, the highest-grossing installment in the franchise, the highest-grossing film in North America, the highest-grossing film of 2015, and the fourth-highest-grossing film of all time, with a worldwide gross of over $2 billion and a net profit of over $780 million. The film also received five Academy Award nominations at the 88th Academy Awards, including Best Visual Effects and garnered four nominations at the 69th British Academy Film Awards including one win for Best Special Visual Effects.

Marvel Cinematic Universe (MCU)
In 2017, Panzieri was called to join the in-house visual effects team at Marvel Studios, to work on the feature film Spider-Man: Homecoming. Afterwards, he joined the compositing department at Digital Domain to work on the feature film Thor: Ragnarok.

In 2018, Panzieri extended his work collaboration with Digital Domain on the feature film Avengers: Infinity War. The film received praise for the emotional weight of the story, as well as the visual effects and action sequences. It was the fifth film and the first superhero film to gross over $2 billion worldwide, breaking numerous box office records and becoming the highest-grossing film of 2018, as well as the fifth-highest-grossing film of all time and in the United States and Canada. The film received Academy Award and BAFTA nominations for achievements in visual effects.

In 2019, Panzieri was hired at Luma Pictures to work on the feature film Spider-Man: Far From Home. The film grossed over  globally and became Sony Pictures' highest-grossing film worldwide.

Netflix
In October 2019, Panzieri joined the Netflix production Jingle Jangle: A Christmas Journey as in-house compositing supervisor. Across 11 months of work, Panzieri supervised a team of artists who completed over 230 shots for post-visualization purposes and more than 70 production shots for the final cut.

In January 2021, Panzieri was hired on the Netflix production Red Notice as the in-house compositing-lead on a team of 7 visual effects artists, who delivered over 330 in-cut final shots and over 200 post-visualization shots across 10 months of post-production. Red Notice became the most-watched film in its debut weekend on Netflix, as well as the most-watched film within 28 days of release on the platform. It also became the 5th most-streamed movie title of 2021.

Dune
From September to November 2021, Panzieri was hired by the visual effects company Wylie Co. to work on the Warner Bros. production Dune. The film grossed $400 million worldwide on a production budget of $165 million and received praise from critics for its visuals and technical innovation. Organizations such as the National Board of Review and the American Film Institute named Dune as one of the top 10 films of 2021. Among its numerous awards and nominations, it received 10 nominations at the 94th Academy Awards, and won the most awards of the ceremony with six, including the Oscar for Best Visual Effects.

Industry roles
Since 2019, Panzieri has been serving as a member of the North American advisory board of the Abruzzo Film Commission. He is a member of the Visual Effects Society, the Academy of Television Arts & Sciences and the Italian Visual Effects Association (Associazione Effetti Visivi).

Filmography

Feature Film

Television

Music Video

Integrated Advertising

Cinematics

Web

References

External links
 Personal Website
 

Visual effects artists
Living people
People of Abruzzese descent
People from Pescara
American people of Italian descent
1985 births